Baltic Americans are Americans of Baltic descent. The term generally includes:

 Latvian Americans
 Lithuanian Americans
 Estonian Americans (depending on definition)
 Finnish Americans (depending on definition)